Catherine McClements (born 30 November 1965) is an Australian stage, film and television actress and television presenter. She is known for her TV roles in Water Rats and Tangle, for which she won Logie Awards, and has performed in stage productions for theatre companies such as  Belvoir St Theatre, the Melbourne Theatre Company, the Sydney Theatre Company and the State Theatre Company of South Australia.

Early life and education
McClements attended the National Institute of Dramatic Art (NIDA), graduating in 1985, alongside Baz Luhrmann, Sonia Todd and Justin Monjo. In 1988, McClements, along with a number of other people including Baz Luhrmann, set up an experimental theatre ensemble called Six Years Old and worked on expanding the play Strictly Ballroom, which was first produced in their second year of NIDA in 1984.

Career
In 1993 she had a role in The Girl from Tomorrow Part II: Tomorrow's End. McClements is best known for her starring role as Rachel Goldstein in the Australian police drama Water Rats from 1996 to 1999. She had a recurring guest role on The Secret Life of Us in 2001, for which she won the AFI Award for Best Actress in a Guest Role in a Television Drama. She later starred as Rosie in the 2003 drama series CrashBurn and appeared in the Network Ten telemovie Mary Bryant in 2005.

From 2008 she played Inspector/Superintendent Kerry Vincent, in the Australian police drama Rush, and psychologist Christine Williams in the Showcase drama Tangle. A second and third season of Tangle and Rush respectively were announced in 2009 and both aired in 2010. Tangle and Rush were commissioned for new seasons, both to start filming in mid-2011. In 2010, McClements won an AFI award for her role in Tangle. She has also won ASTRA awards for her role in Tangle in 2011 and 2013.

McClements is also an accomplished stage actress who has appeared in stage productions for many theatre companies, including Belvoir St Theatre, the Melbourne Theatre Company, the Sydney Theatre Company, Bell Shakespeare and the Malthouse Theatre. In 1987, she worked in Adelaide with the South Australia Theatre Company.

In 2011, McClements guest starred in a YouTube and Facebook-only show called Queer as F**k, playing Mel who was a friend of main character Aaron (Gary Abrahams).

In 2012, McClements was cast as Meg Jackson in Wentworth, a contemporary reimagining of the Australian classic Prisoner. She was cast in a leading role for Season One of Wentworth, but her character did not appear beyond episode one. Also in 2013, McClements returned to the stage in Sharr White's play The Other Place for the Melbourne Theatre Company and Phèdre for Bell Shakespeare.

Earlier in 2013, McClements was cast in new ABC telemovie The Broken Shore, alongside Don Hany, Dan Wyllie and Claudia Karvan. It premiered at the Adelaide Film Festival in October 2013 and aired on the ABC in early 2014.

In September 2013, McClements was cast in the film The Menkoff Method, directed by David Parker.

In 2019 she starred in Ms Fisher's Modern Murder Mysteries as Birdie Birnside.

In August 2022 she plays the part of a teacher in the State Theatre Company South Australia and Sydney Theatre Company co-production Chalkface, written by Angela Betzien. The play opens at the Dunstan Playhouse in Adelaide.

Awards

Personal life
McClements' husband is actor Jacek Koman, who also guest-starred in The Secret Life of Us as Dominic, though they were not on the show at the same time. They met at the Anthill Theatre in Melbourne in the late 1980s, and have a daughter named Coco and a son named Quincy. McClements' sister is Georgina McClements, a producer, who has credits in shows such as Summer Heights High and Real Stories. Her brother is Brendan McClements, who is the current CEO of Victorian Major Events Company. McClements is good friends with fellow actress Claudia Karvan, whom she met at the AFI awards in 1990 and starred with in the film Redheads in 1992.

Filmography

Television

Self

Theatre work

References

External links

1965 births
20th-century Australian actresses
21st-century Australian actresses
Actresses from Melbourne
Australian film actresses
Australian stage actresses
Australian television actresses
National Institute of Dramatic Art alumni
Living people
Logie Award winners
Best Actress AACTA Award winners